René Dary (19 July 1905 – 6 October 1974) was a French film actor. Dary began his career as a child actor.

Selected filmography
 The Lie of Nina Petrovna (1937)
 S.O.S. Sahara (1938)
 The Fugitive (1947)
 Five Red Tulips (1949)
 Suzanne and the Robbers (1949)
 A Certain Mister (1950)
 Fugitive from Montreal (1950)
 Touchez pas au grisbi (1954)
 The Loves of Hercules (1960)
 Napoleon II, the Eagle (1961)
 Daniella by Night (1961)
 Trap for Cinderella (1965)
 Fire of Love (1967)

References

Bibliography
 Michael Witt & Michael Temple. The French Cinema Book. Palgrave Macmillan, 2008.
 Holmstrom, John. The Moving Picture Boy: An International Encyclopaedia from 1895 to 1995, Norwich, Michael Russell, 1996, pp. 25–26.

External links

1905 births
1974 deaths
Male actors from Paris
French male film actors
20th-century French male actors
French male child actors